The meridian 97° east of Greenwich is a line of longitude that extends from the North Pole across the Arctic Ocean, Asia, the Indian Ocean, the Southern Ocean, and Antarctica to the South Pole.

The 97th meridian east forms a great circle with the 83rd meridian west.

From Pole to Pole
Starting at the North Pole and heading south to the South Pole, the 97th meridian east passes through:

{| class="wikitable plainrowheaders"
! scope="col" width="120" | Co-ordinates
! scope="col" | Country, territory or sea
! scope="col" | Notes
|-
| style="background:#b0e0e6;" | 
! scope="row" style="background:#b0e0e6;" | Arctic Ocean
| style="background:#b0e0e6;" |
|-valign="top"
| 
! scope="row" | 
| Krasnoyarsk Krai — Komsomolets Island and October Revolution Island, Severnaya Zemlya
|-
| style="background:#b0e0e6;" | 
! scope="row" style="background:#b0e0e6;" | Kara Sea
| style="background:#b0e0e6;" |
|-valign="top"
| 
! scope="row" | 
| Krasnoyarsk Krai — The Nordenskiöld Archipelago and the mainland Irkutsk Oblast — from  Tuva Republic — from 
|-
| 
! scope="row" | 
|
|-valign="top"
| 
! scope="row" | 
| Gansu Qinghai — from  Tibet — from 
|-valign="top"
| 
! scope="row" | 
| Arunachal Pradesh — partly claimed by 
|-
| 
! scope="row" |  (Burma)
|
|-
| 
! scope="row" | 
| Arunachal Pradesh — for about 19 km
|-
| 
! scope="row" |  (Burma)
|
|-
| style="background:#b0e0e6;" | 
! scope="row" style="background:#b0e0e6;" | Indian Ocean
| style="background:#b0e0e6;" | Andaman Sea
|-
| 
! scope="row" | 
| Island of Sumatra
|-valign="top"
| style="background:#b0e0e6;" | 
! scope="row" style="background:#b0e0e6;" | Indian Ocean
|-
| style="background:#b0e0e6;" | 
! scope="row" style="background:#b0e0e6;" | Southern Ocean
| style="background:#b0e0e6;" |
|-
| 
! scope="row" | Antarctica
| Australian Antarctic Territory, claimed by 
|-
|}

e097 meridian east